KITT or K.I.T.T.  is the short name of two fictional characters from the adventure franchise Knight Rider. While having the same acronym, the KITTs are two different entities: one known as the Knight Industries Two Thousand, which appeared in the original TV series Knight Rider, and the other as the Knight Industries Three Thousand, which appeared first in the two-hour 2008 pilot film for a new Knight Rider TV series and then the new series itself. In both instances, KITT is an artificially intelligent electronic computer module in the body of a highly advanced, very mobile, robotic automobile: the original KITT as a 1982 Pontiac Firebird Trans Am, and the second KITT as a 2008–2009 Ford Shelby GT500KR.

During filming, KITT was voiced by a script assistant, with voice actors recording KITT's dialog later. David Hasselhoff and original series voice actor William Daniels first met each other six months after the series began filming. KITT's evil twin is KARR, whose name is an acronym of Knight Automated Roving Robot. KARR was voiced first by Peter Cullen and later by Paul Frees in seasons one and three, respectively, of the NBC original TV series Knight Rider. A 1991 sequel film, Knight Rider 2000, is centered on KITT's original microprocessor unit transferred into the body of the vehicle intended to be his successor, the Knight Industries Four Thousand (Knight 4000), voiced by Carmen Argenziano and William Daniels. Val Kilmer voiced KITT in the 2008–2009 Knight Rider series.

Knight Industries Two Thousand (KITT) 

In the original Knight Rider series, the character of KITT (Knight Industries Two Thousand) was physically embodied as a modified 1982 Pontiac Trans Am. KITT was designed by customizer Michael Scheffe. The convertible and super-pursuit KITTs were designed and built by George Barris.

Development 
In the history of the television show, the first KITT, voiced by William Daniels, was said to have been designed by the late Wilton Knight, a brilliant but eccentric billionaire, who established the Foundation for Law And Government (FLAG) and its parent Knight Industries. The 2008 pilot film implied that Charles Graiman, creator of the Knight Industries Three Thousand, also had a hand in designing the first KITT. An unknown number of KITT's systems were designed at Stanford University. KITT's total initial production cost was estimated at $11,400,000 in 1982 (Episode 5, "Just My Bill").

The 1991 movie Knight Rider 2000 saw the first KITT (Knight Industries Two Thousand) in pieces, and Michael Knight himself reviving the Knight 2000 microprocessor unit, which is eventually transferred into the body of the vehicle intended to be the original KITT's direct successor, the Knight 4000. The new vehicle was a modified 1991 Dodge Stealth, appearing similar to the Pontiac Banshee prototype.

In the 1997–1998 spin-off series Team Knight Rider, KITT is employed as a shadow advisor. It is later revealed that "The Shadow" is actually a hologram run by KITT. In "Knight of the Living Dead", Graiman states a third KITT exists as a backup. When KITT is about to die, his memories are downloaded so the third KITT can use them. However, the third AI is not used in the end.

While the 2008 pilot movie, and then the new series, appears to be a revamp of the original series, it offers some continuity from the original one. The "new" or "second" KITT (Knight Industries Three Thousand) is a different vehicle and microprocessor unit.

In Knight Rider 2000, it is stated that most of the Knight 2000 parts had been sold off. However, Graiman's garage in the 2008 pilot shows a more complete collection of parts than in the boxes recovered by Michael Knight in Knight Rider 2000. The original Knight Industries Two Thousand is also shown in the pilot movie (although in pieces) in the scene where the garage of Charles Graiman (creator of the Knight Industries Three Thousand and implied co-designer of the original KITT) is searched by antagonists. A Trans-Am body (without its hood) is partially covered by a tarp, on which rests the rear spoiler. The famous KITT steering wheel (labelled "Knight Two Thousand") and "KNIGHT" license plate are also shown, along with numerous black muscle car body parts. When the camera shows a full scene of the garage, there are four other Knight two thousand cars being stored there.  One has been taken apart, and 3 other complete cars.  If you pause at the right moment all 4 cars are visible.

AI personality and communication 
According to the series, the original KITT's main cybernetic processor was first installed in a mainframe computer used by the US government in Washington, D.C. However, Wilton saw better use for "him" in the Foundation's crime-fighting crusade and eventually this AI system was installed in the vehicle.

KITT is an advanced supercomputer on wheels. The "brain" of KITT is the Knight 2000 microprocessor, which is the centre of a "self-aware" cybernetic logic module. This allows KITT to think, learn, communicate and interact with humans. He is also capable of independent thought and action. He has an ego that is easy to bruise and displays a very sensitive, but kind and dryly humorous personality. According to Episode 55, "Dead of Knight", KITT has 1,000 megabits of memory with one nanosecond access time. According to Episode 65, "Ten Wheel Trouble", KITT's future capacity is unlimited. KITT's serial number is AD227529, as mentioned in Episode 31, "Soul Survivor".

KITT's Voice (Anharmonic) Synthesizer (for speech) and Etymotic Equalizer (audio input) allow his logic module to speak and communicate. With it, KITT can also simulate other sounds. KITT's primary spoken language was English; however, by accessing his language module, he can speak fluently in Spanish, French and much more. The module can be adjusted, giving KITT different accents such as in Episode 82, "Out of the Woods", where KITT uses a "New York City" accent and called Michael "Micky". During the first season, KITT's "mouth" in the interior of the vehicle was indicated by a flashing red square. In episode 14 "Heart of Stone", this was changed to three sectioned vertical bars, as this design proved popular with fans as part of KARR. KITT can also project his voice as a loudspeaker or as a form of ventriloquism (First used in Episode 48, "Knight of the Drones, Pt. 2").

KITT is in constant contact with Michael via a comlink through a two-way communication wristwatch (a modified '80s LCD AM radio watch) Michael wore. The watch also has a micro camera and scanner that KITT can access to gather information. In an emergency, Michael can activate a secret homing beacon hidden inside a gold pendant he wears around his neck. The beacon sends a priority signal that can remotely activate KITT, even if KITT were deactivated, and override his programming so that he rushes to Michael's aid. Used in Episode 42, "A Good Knight's Work" and in "Knights of the Fast Lane".

Physical features 

 Dashboard equipment 
KITT has two CRT video display monitors on his dash. KITT later only has one when his dash was redesigned by Bonnie for the show's third season. Michael can contact home base and communicate with Devon and others by way of a telephone comlink using KITT's video display.  The video display is also used for the Graphic Translator system (which sketches likenesses from verbal input to create a Facial composite), as well as for scanning or analysis results. KITT can also print hard copies of data on a dashboard-mounted printer (First used in Episode 15, "The Topaz Connection").

KITT also has an in-dash entertainment system that can play music and video, and run various computer programs including arcade games.

KITT can dispense money to Michael when he needed it (First used in Episode 59, "Knight by a Nose").

KITT has an Ultraphonic Chemical Analyzer scanning tray which can analyze the chemical properties of various materials. It can even scan fingerprints and read ballistic information off bullets and compare these with a police database. The system can also analyze chemical information gathered from KITT's exterior sensors (First used in Episode 17, "Chariot of Gold").

KITT can release oxygen into his driver compartment and provide air to passengers if he was ever submerged in water or buried in earth. This is also used to overcome the effects of certain drugs (First used in Episode 5, "Slammin' Sammy's Stunt Show Spectacular".)

Scanning and microwave jamming
KITT has a front-mounted scanner bar called the Anamorphic Equalizer. The device is a fibre-optic array of electronic eyes. The scanner can see in all visual wavelengths, as well as X-ray and infrared. Its infrared Tracking Scope can monitor the position of specific vehicles in the area within 10 miles. The scanner is also KITT's most vulnerable area. Occasionally, the bar can pulse in different patterns and sweep rapidly or very slowly. Glen A. Larson, the creator of both Knight Rider and Battlestar Galactica has stated that the scanner is a nod to the Battlestar Galactica characters, the Cylons, and even used the iconic Cylon eye scanner audio to that effect.  He stated that the two shows have nothing else in common and to remove any fan speculation, stated in the Season One Knight Rider DVD audio-comments, that he simply reused the scanning light for KITT because he liked the effect.

KITT also has an array of tiny audio and visual microscanners and sensors threaded throughout his interior and exterior which allows for the tracking of anything around the car. KITT can also "smell" via an atmospheric sampling device mounted in his front bumper.

When scanning in Surveillance Mode:
 KITT could detect people and vehicles and track their movements and discern proximity.
 KITT could gather structural schematics of buildings, vehicles, or other devices and help Michael avoid potential danger when he was snooping.
 KITT could monitor radio transmissions and telephone communications within a location and trace those calls.
 KITT could tap into computer systems to monitor, or upload and download information as long as he could break the access codes.

KITT's other sensors include: a medical scanner that includes an electrocardiograph (EKG). The medical scanner can monitor the vital signs of individuals and display them on his monitors. It can indicate such conditions as if they were injured, poisoned, undergoing stress or other emotional behavior (First used in Episode 1, "Knight of the Phoenix (Pt. 2)"); a Voice Stress Analyzer which can process spoken voices and determine if someone may be lying (First used in Episode 26, "Merchants of Death"); and a bomb sniffer module that can detect explosives within a few yards of the vehicle (First used in Episode 25, "Brother's Keeper");

KITT has a microwave jamming system that plays havoc on electrical systems. This lets him take control of electronic machines, allowing things like cheating at slot machines, breaking electronic locks, fouling security cameras, and withdrawing money from ATMs. KITT can also use microwaves to heat a vehicle's brake fluid, causing it to expand and thus apply the brakes of the car. In Episode 26, "Merchants of Death", the microwave system's power has been increased 3 times its normal strength, strong enough to bring down a helicopter at a limited distance.

Features 
KITT is armored with "Tri-Helical Plasteel 1000 MBS" (Molecular Bonded Shell) plating which protects him from almost all forms of conventional firearms and explosive devices. He can only be harmed by heavy artillery and rockets, and even then, the blast usually left most of his body intact and only damaged internal components. This makes KITT's body durable enough to act as a shield for explosives, ram through rigid barriers of strong material without suffering damage himself and sustain frequent long jumps on turbo boost. The shell also protected him from fire. However, it was vulnerable to electricity, as seen in the episode "Lost Knight" (season 3 episode 10), when a surge of electricity shorted out his memory. The shell was also vulnerable to some potent acids and, in episode 70 "Knight Of The Juggernaut", a formula was made (with knowledge of the shell's chemical base) to neutralize it completely. The shell offers little to almost no protection from lasers in certain episodes. The shell is a combination of three secret substances together referred to as the Knight Compound, developed by Wilton Knight, who entrusted parts of the formula to three separate people, who each know only two pieces of the formula. The shell provided a frame tolerance of 223,000 lb (111.5 tons) and a front and rear axle suspension load of 57,000 lb (28.5 tons). In the pilot, "Knight of the Phoenix", the shell is described as the panels of the car itself; in later episodes, especially from season two onward, the idea of the shell being applied to a base vehicle chemically is used.

KITT is also protected by a thermal-resistant Pyroclastic lamination coating that can withstand sustained temperatures of up to 800 degrees Fahrenheit (426 °C). First used in Episode 32, "Ring of Fire".

KITT can tint the windshield and windows to become opaque (First seen in Episode 14, "Give Me Liberty... or Give Me Death") and can also deflate and re-inflate his tires (First used in Episode #5  "Slammin' Sammy's Stunt Show Spectacular"). KITT's tires can produce traction spikes that allow KITT to overcome steep terrain. First seen in Episode 86 "Hills of Fire".

KITT has two front ejection seats, mostly used when Michael needed a boost to fire escapes or rooftops. First used in Episode 1, "Knight of the Phoenix (Pt. 1)". KITT also has a hidden winch and grappling hook system. Most often the hook is connected by a strong cable, but a metal arm has also been seen. The grappling hook is first used in Episode 6, "Not a Drop to Drink"; the winch is first used in Episode 13, "Forget Me Not".

KITT has a hidden switch and setting dial under the dash that either completely shuts down his AI module or deactivates certain systems should the need arise. First used in Episode 17, "Chariot of Gold". He also has a function which can be activated in order to completely lock the AI from all the vehicle controls, such as preventing KITT from activating Auto Cruise or anyone inside the car from doing something that would probably hurt them. KITT is still able to protest such actions vocally. First used in Episode 8, "Trust Doesn't Rust".

KITT's headlights can flash red and blue as police lights and he has a siren. First used in Episode 38, "Race for Life".

KITT is equipped with a parachute. First used in Episode 23, "Goliath Returns (Pt. 1)".

 Equipment for attack and defense 
From under the rear bumper, KITT can spray a jet of oil, creating an oil slick; or emit a plume of smoke, creating a smoke screen (both were first used in Episode 1, "Knight of the Phoenix"). KITT can also dispense a cloud of tear gas along with his smoke screen (First used in Episode 13, "Hearts of Stone").

KITT has an induction coil he can produce from under his front bumper and that, being placed on a metal object, KITT can remotely induce electrical voltage or current in that object. First used in "Knight of the Drones (Part I)" to electrify a fence in order to incapacitate two thugs without seriously harming them.

KITT has flame throwers mounted under his bumpers. First used in Episode 2, "Deadly Maneuvers".

KITT can launch magnesium flares, which can also be used to divert heat-seeking missiles fired at him. First used in Episode 26, "Merchants of Death".

KITT can fire a high powered ultra-frequency modulated resonating laser, capable of burning through steel plating. First used in Episode 9, "Trust Doesn't Rust" and was used to try and destroy KARR by hitting KARR's only weak spot. Until the laser was calibrated, KITT could not fire it himself and it could only be fired by KITT's technician Bonnie. Also as pointed out in "Trust Doesn't Rust", if at that time, it was fired more than twice, it would drain KITT's batteries. Later in "Goliath part 2", KITT was installed a more user friendly laser power pack which was very useful in disabling the monstrous 18 wheeler.

KITT can automatically open and close his doors, windows, hood, trunk, and T-tops. He could also lock his doors to prevent unauthorized entry into his driver compartment. KITT can also rotate his "KNIGHT" license plate to reveal a fictitious one reading "KNI 667". Michael used this to evade police when an APB was placed on him. First used in Episode 25, "Brother's Keeper".

KITT could put out small fires from a CO2 sprayer in his bumpers. He could spray a gas into the driver compartment that could render an unwanted occupant unconscious. KITT could also expel all breathable air from the driver compartment; however, only KARR ever threatened to use it to harm someone. KITT used this to rid the compartment of smoke after bombs were detonated in his trunk.

Engine and driving
KITT is powered by the Knight Industries turbojet engine, with modified afterburners. and a computer controlled 8-speed turbodrive transmission. This helps him do 0–60 mph in 2 seconds (1.37g), standing to quarter mile 4.286 seconds. Electromagnetic hyper-vacuum disc brakes: 14 foot (4.25 m) braking distance (70–0 mph – 112–0 km/h – 11.7g).

KITT primarily uses hydrogen fuel. However, his complex fuel processor allows him to run on any combustible liquid, even regular gasoline. In one episode, KITT mentioned his fuel economy was at least 65 miles per gallon. However, when operating on fuels other than liquid hydrogen, KITT's fuel efficiency and power output may be lowered.

Used in most episodes, KITT can employ a "turbo boost". This is a pair of rocket boosters mounted just behind the front tires. These lifted the car, allowing KITT to jump into the air and pass over obstacles in the road. Also, occasionally, Turbo Boost was used to allow KITT to accelerate to incredible speeds in excess of 200 mph (322 km/h). The boosters could fire forward or backward, although the backward booster was rarely used.

In later seasons, a passive laser restraint system helped protect Michael and any passengers from the shock of sudden impacts and hard stopping. It is speculated that this is a primitive form of an inertial damping device. First used in Episode 47, "Knight of the Drones".

KITT has four main driving modes:
 Normal cruise – On "Normal", Michael has control of the car. In an emergency, KITT can still take over and activate Auto Cruise mode.
 Auto cruise – KITT has an "Alpha Circuit" as part of his main control system, which allows the CPU to drive the car utilizing an advanced Auto Collision Avoidance system. KARR's Alpha Circuit was damaged due to being submerged in water for a time, which required him to have an operator to control his Turbo Boost function.
 Pursuit mode – "Pursuit" is used during high-speed driving and is a combination of manual and computer assisted operation. KITT could respond to road conditions faster than Michael's reflexes could; however, Michael was technically in control of the vehicle and KITT helped guide certain maneuvers.
 Silent mode – The feature dampens his engine noise and allows him to sneak around. First used in Episode 37, "White-Line Warriors".

Other vehicle modes included: a two-wheel ski drive, which allowed KITT to "ski" (driving up on two wheels) on either left or right side (First used in Episode 1, "Knight of the Phoenix"); an aquatic synthesizer which allows KITT to hydroplane, effectively "driving" on water, using his wheels and turbo system for propulsion (First used in Episode 28, "Return to Cadiz"), but which was removed by the end of the episode because it was faulty; and a High Traction Drop Downs (HTDD) system which hydraulically raises KITT's chassis for better traction when driving off-road (First used in Episode 39, "Speed Demons").

Fourth season update
During the first episode of the fourth season, "Knight of the Juggernaut, Part I". KITT's Molecular Bonded Shell is intentionally neutralized by a sprayed combination of chemicals, and KITT is nearly destroyed by the Juggernaut. a custom-designed armored vehicle. KITT is redesigned, and is repaired and rebuilt in "Knight of the Juggernaut, Part II".

One main feature of the redesign is that Super-Pursuit mode is added, consisting of improved rocket boosters for enhanced acceleration, retractable spoilers for aerodynamic stability, and movable air inlets for increased cooling. Super-Pursuit Mode provided a 40% boost in speed beyond the car's original top speed of 300 MPH. When Super-Pursuit mode is used at night some of the exterior and under the wheel arches glow red. This also included an emergency braking system which slows KITT down from Super-Pursuit speeds, by using a forward braking booster and air panels that pop out to create air friction (air brakes).

While KITT's initial roof was a T-top, the redesigned KITT now has a convertible roof. Michael can bring the top down by pressing the "C" button on KITT's dash.

Screen-used cars 
A total of 23 KITT cars were made for use in filming the series, although speculation is that there were as many as 25. All except one of these cars survived until the show was axed; all except 5 of the remaining 22 cars were destroyed at the end of filming. This is because the series began with 5 brand new Pontiacs for the pilot presentation, and in 1982 a nearby train carrying new Pontiacs to dealerships derailed in California, and Universal Studios acquired these wrecked cars for a low price.  The contract stipulated that the cars couldn't be sold again for private use because of the train damage, so they had to be crushed when Universal Studios no longer needed them.
Of the 5 that escaped that fate: 1 stunt car (originally at the universal theme park) was shipped to a theme park in Australia, for World Expo '88, in Brisbane, Queensland, but is now believed to be back in the US. Universal kept one 'hero' and one stunt car for use in the Entertainment Center display – the two originals have since been sold to a private collector in the US; another, a convertible, disappeared for a while before being sold to the former Cars of the Stars Motor Museum in Keswick, Cumbria, England This convertible was sold to the Dezer Collection, Orlando, Florida when Cars of the Stars closed. The fifth car is believed to be in private hands in the UK.

A small group of individuals that call themselves Knight Rider Historians purchased 2 of the screen used KITT cars and they have been restored.  One of the cars appeared in the episode where KITT was dumped into an acid pit and appears gutted and light grey in color on screen in the episode. They are frequently on display; one is currently on display in the Peterson Museum in Los Angeles.  Knight Rider Historians also recently tracked down the original FLAG Semi truck and the trailer, used in the first seasons of the show, and are currently restoring them as well.  The Semi truck was found in Idaho in a field. The 1978 Dorsey trailer had been modified to carry race cars in the late 1980s and the original rear ramp door used to drive KITT in and out on the series had been long removed.  Knight Rider Historians plans to fully restore the trailer to appear exactly as it did during the series run, albeit slightly smaller scale because the interior of the trailer seen on-screen was actually an interior set on the Universal Studios lot, and was several feet wider than the actual trailer.

Knight Rider Historians states they have the most extensive research and data on the production of the series, including production call sheets and records on vehicles owned by Universal Studios while the show was in production.

Press releases regularly appear claiming 'original screen-used' cars are being sold. For example: on April 4, 2007, "one of the four KITT cars used in production of the television series" was reputedly being put up for sale for $149,995 by Johnny Verhoek of Kassabian Motors, Dublin, California.  And a story in USA Today from December 2007 states that slain real estate developer and car aficionado, Andrew Kissel, was in possession of one of the surviving cars. Some reports say that Michael Jackson bought an original KITT and former NSYNC band member Joey Fatone also claims to have purchased one of these authentic original KITTs at auction. There have been more 'original' cars auctioned than were built in total for the show.

The September 25, 2014, fifth episode of the Dutch TV programme Syndroom, featuring people with Down syndrome who wish to fulfill a dream, features Twan Vermeulen, a Knight Rider fan who wishes to meet David Hasselhoff and KITT. Together with the show's presenter they fly to L.A. and go searching for Hasselhoff's house. They "find" Hasselhoff on the driveway in front of his house, dusting off KITT. After KITT speaks a personal message to Twan, Hasselhoff offers to go with him to take KITT for a spin, "Freak out some people on the freeway", which they did with great pleasure for everyone involved.

The right-hand drive KITT, known as the "Official Right Hand Drive KITT" as used in the video "Jump In My Car" by David Hasselhoff, is owned by a company called Wilderness Studios Australia.

Knight Industries Three Thousand (KITT)

The 2008 update to Knight Rider includes a new KITT – the acronym now standing for Knight Industries Three Thousand. The KITT platform is patterned on a Shelby GT500KR and differs from the original Two Thousand unit in several ways. For example, the 2008 KITT utilizes nano-technology, allowing the car's outer shell to change colors and morph itself into similar forms temporarily. The nanotech platform is written as needing the AI active in order to produce any of these effects, unlike the original car's gadgets and "molecular bonded shell" which allowed it to endure extreme impacts. These extreme down-sides to the use of nanotech have been demonstrated when villains are able to cause significant damage, such as shooting out windows, when the AI is deactivated. It can also turn into two different types of a Ford F-150 4x4 truck (one completely stock and the other with some modifications), a Ford E-150 van, a Ford Crown Victoria Police Interceptor, a special edition Warriors In Pink Mustang (in support of breast cancer awareness month), a Ford Flex, and a 1969 Ford Mustang Mach 1 for disguise or to use the alternate modes' capabilities (such as off-road handling). The car can engage an "Attack Mode", featuring scissor/conventional hybrid doors, which allows it to increase speed and use most of its gadgets (including turbo boost). It had a different looking attack mode in the pilot which was used whenever the car needed to increase speed. Its downside however is that it only seats two. KITT is also capable of functioning submerged, maintaining life support and system integrity while underwater.

While the original series stated the original KITT was designed by Wilton Knight, the 2008 TV movie implies Charles Graiman may have co-designed the car and the AI for Wilton Knight, was subsequently relocated to protect him and his family, and later designed the Knight Industries Three Thousand. KITT's weapons include a grappling hook located in the front bumper, usable in normal and attack modes, two gatling-style guns that are retracted from the hood, a laser, and missile launchers usable only in attack mode, which were first used in "Knight of the Hunter". In the Halloween episode "Knight of the Living Dead", KITT demonstrates the ability to cosmetically alter his appearance, becoming a black Mustang convertible with a pink trim as a Halloween costume. This configuration had the scanner bar relocated to behind the grille. Dr. Graiman also reveals in this episode that a backup neural network exists when he suggests downloading KITT's files and reuploading them to the backup, to which replies "The Backup is not me." In the pilot, KITT had shown himself capable of similarly altering his external appearance—changing his color and licence plate. In "Knight of the Zodiac", KITT uses a dispenser located in his undercarriage to spread black ice, and a fingerprint generator in the glovebox to overlay the fingerprints of a captured thief over Mike's.

KITT has numerous other features: an olfactory sensor that allows KITT to "smell" via an atmospheric sampling device mounted in his front bumper, turbo boost, a voice stress analyzer that's used to process spoken voices and determine if someone may be lying, a computer printout that could print hard copies of data on a dashboard-mounted printer, a backup mainframe processor, a windshield projection used in place of the center console screen in the pilot for displaying extra information as well as the video communication link with the SSC, a bio matrix scanner used to detect the health status of persons in the immediate area, a hood surface screen, an electromagnetic pulse projector that can disable any electronic circuit or device within the given area, the ability to fire disk-like objects that produce an intense heat source to deter heat-seeking projectiles, the ability to fill the cabin with tear gas to incapacitate thieves, a 3D object printer that allows for the creation of small 3D objects (such as keys) based on available electronic data, a standard printer used for documents and incoming faxes that's located in the passenger side dash, a small arms cache accessible via the glove box area that usually contains two 9MM handguns with extra clips for occupant's protection outside KITT, a first aid inside the glove box that allows for field mending of physical wounds such as lost appendages, and a software program secretly built into KITT that, when activated, by the SSC, turns KITT into a bomb using his fuel as the charge and his computer as the detonator.

Knight Industries Four Thousand (Knight 4000)

A 1991 made-for-TV movie sequel to the 1982 series, Knight Rider 2000, saw KITT's original microprocessor unit transferred into the body of the vehicle intended to be his successor, the Knight 4000 (referred to as "KIFT" by fans). The vehicle had numerous 21st-century technological improvements over the 1980s Pontiac Trans-Am version of KITT, such as an amphibious mode (which allows the car to travel across water like a speedboat), a virtual reality heads-up display (or VR-HUD, which utilized the entire windshield as a video display), a microwave stun device that could remotely incapacitate a human target, a remote target assist that helps the pilot to aim and fire with a complete and perfect accuracy, voice activated controls, a fax machine, an infrared scanner that could scan on an infrared level to identify laser scope rifles as well as hidden objects giving off heat, a more complex olfactory scan, a voice sampler that could simulate any voice which has been recorded into the Knight 4000's memory, a microwave projector that could cause the temperatures of targeted objects to quickly rise and either ignite or explode, and a thermal sensor that allows the Knight 4000 to watch and record what is happening in a particular place. However, no acknowledgement is made to this spin-off in the 2008–2009 series revival.

The studio was unable to use the real Pontiac Banshee IV concept car for the movie, so instead it hired Jay Ohrberg Star Cars Inc. to customize a 1991 Dodge Stealth for the Knight 4000. After filming wrapped, the custom car was used on other TV productions of the time and can also be seen, albeit briefly, as a stolen supercar in CHiPs '99, as repainted future police vehicles in Power Rangers Time Force, in an episode of the television series Black Scorpion in March 2001, and in a hidden camera TV series called Scare Tactics. After being abandoned and unmaintained for 10 years, one of the screen-used cars was offered for sale in January 2021 by Bob's Prop Shop in Las Vegas.

KARR 

KARR (Knight Automated Roving Robot) is the name of a fictional, automated, prototype vehicle featured as a major antagonist of KITT (Knight Industries Two Thousand), in two episodes of the 1982 original series, and was part of a multi-episode story arc in the 2008 revived series.

KARR (voiced by Peter Cullen) first appeared in "Trust Doesn't Rust" aired on NBC on November 19, 1982, where he seemingly met his demise at the end. However, he was so popular with viewers that he was brought back again in "K.I.T.T. vs. K.A.R.R.", for a second time (voiced by voice actor Paul Frees) which aired on NBC on November 4, 1984.

Trust Doesn't Rust was also printed in book form, written by Roger Hill and Glen A. Larson, following the story and general script of the original television episode, expanding some areas of the plot and adding several extra secondary characters.

KARR was brought back in 2009 for "Knight to King's Pawn" of the new "Knight Rider" series of 2008–2009 for a third time (marking it as one of the very few villains in the original series and the new series to make a return appearance).

KARR design and development 
KARR was originally designed by Wilton Knight and built by Knight Industries for military purposes for the Department of Defense. After the completion of the vehicle, the KARR processor was installed and activated. However, a programming error caused the computer to be unstable and potentially dangerous. KARR was programmed for self-preservation, but this proved to be dangerous to the Foundation's humanitarian interests. The project was suspended and KARR was stored until a solution could be found. Once KITT was constructed, it was presumed that his prototype KARR had been deactivated and dismantled. However, the latter did not occur and KARR was placed in storage and forgotten following the death of Wilton Knight. KARR was later unwittingly reactivated by thieves in the original episode Trust Doesn't Rust, and was thought destroyed, but then reappeared in the episode K.I.T.T. vs. K.A.R.R and was seen to be finally destroyed by Michael and KITT.

Originally KARR was identical to KITT – all black with a red scan bar. Upon KARR's return in "K.I.T.T. vs. K.A.R.R.", his scan bar is now amber/yellow but is otherwise still the same as KITT.  KARR later gets a brand new two-tone paint job incorporating a silver lower body into the familiar black finish. KARR's scanner originally made a low droning noise, and the sound of KARR's engine originally sounded rough, but in the return episode the scanner and the engine both sounds similar to KITT's albeit with a slight reverb effect added. In "Trust Doesn't Rust" KARR had no license plates, but a California license plate that read "KARR" from his second appearance onwards.  KARR's voice modulator showed as greenish-yellow on his dash display, a different color and design than the various incarnations of KITT's red display.

Personality 
Unlike KITT, whose primary directive is to protect human life, KARR was programmed for self-preservation, making him a ruthless and unpredictable threat. He does not appear as streetwise as KITT, being very naïve and inexperienced and having a childlike perception of the world. This has occasionally allowed people to take advantage of his remarkable capabilities for their own gain;  however, due to his ruthless nature, he sometimes uses people's weaknesses and greed as a way to manipulate them for his own goals. Despite this, he does ultimately consider itself superior (always referring to KITT as "the inferior production line model") as well as unstoppable, and due to his programming, the villains don't usually get very far. KARR demonstrates a complete lack of respect or loyalty – on one occasion ejecting his passenger to reduce weight and increase his chances of escape.

KARR's evil personality is also somewhat different in the comeback episode. His childlike perceptions are diminished into a more devious personality, completely cold and bent on revenge. His self-preservation directive is no longer in play. When KARR is close to exploding after receiving severe damage; he willingly turbo-jumps into a mid-air collision with KITT, hoping that his own destruction would also spell his counterpart's. Even KARR's modus operandi is different; servicing enough in the first episode, he aims to actually make use of other people to serve his own needs. One explanation of this change could be as a result of the damage he received after falling over the cliff at the end of "Trust Doesn't Rust", causing further malfunctions in his programming. Indeed, KITT himself is seen to malfunction and suffer change of personality as a result of damage in several other episodes.

KARR 2.0 

To mirror the original series, the nemesis and prototype of the second KITT (Knight Industries Three Thousand) is also designated KARR in the new series. KARR 2.0 (Peter Cullen) is mentioned in the new Knight Rider series episode "Knight of the Living Dead", and is said to be a prototype of KITT (Knight Industries Three Thousand). The new KARR acronym was changed to "Knight Auto-cybernetic Roving Robotic-exoskeleton".

KARR's visual identity has also had similar changes for the new series. Instead of an automobile, a schematic display shows a heavily armed humanoid-looking robot with wheeled legs that converts into an ambiguous off-road vehicle. KARR has the ability to transform from vehicle mode into a large wheeled robotic exoskeleton, instead of KITT's "Attack Mode". The vehicle mode of KARR is a 2008–2009 Shelby GT500KR with the license plate initials K.R. KARR is once again voiced by Peter Cullen, who also voiced the first appearance of KARR in "Trust Doesn't Rust".

KARR was originally designed for military combat. Armed with twin machine guns on each shoulder and missiles, the exoskeleton combines with a human being for easier control. KARR is visually identical to KITT in this iteration, lacking the two-tone black and silver paint job of the 1980s version of KARR. The only difference is the scanner and voice box, which are yellow compared to KITT's red. Once again, similar to the original character, this entirely different "KARR" project (2.0) had an A.I. that was programmed for self-preservation, and he was deactivated and placed in storage after he reprogrammed itself and killed seven people.

When KARR finally appears again in the episode "Knight to King's Pawn", he takes a form once again similar to KITT as a 2008 Ford Shelby Mustang GT500KR, and is once again 100% black like KITT 3000, the only difference is that he has a yellow scan light bar and 100% yellow color voice module.  In the original series, it was more amber/yellow, and KARR's voice module originally yellow-green in the original series. KARR's scanner sounds much lower with much more of an echo. The sound is especially noticeable when KARR is chasing down KITT while he is still in Ford Mustang mode.

History 
Once KITT was constructed, it was presumed that his prototype KARR had been deactivated and dismantled. However, the latter did not occur and KARR was placed in storage and forgotten following the death of Wilton Knight. In the episode "Trust Doesn't Rust", two thieves named Tony and the Rev break into the warehouse where KARR is "sleeping" where they unwittingly reactivated him, and he escapes with them. When the thieves realize how useful the vehicle could be, they use KARR to go on a crime spree. Michael and KITT are sent to recover KARR before anyone becomes hurt. Fearful of being taken back to storage and certain deactivation, KARR was unwilling to go back to the Foundation, and he flees when Michael and KITT come looking for him. They later kidnap Bonnie and force her to repair KARR, although she unsuccessfully tries to sabotage KARR. The Rev eventually refuses to help Tony and KARR any further, as he is concerned for Tony's safety, leading Tony to knock him out and abandon him. Michael rescues Bonnie, but KARR and Tony escape. KARR later abandons Tony so he'll have a better chance to escape from the police. When KARR threatens to destroy KITT in a head-on collision, Michael (remembering KARR's weakness) plays chicken with him, knowing KARR will veer out of KITT's path in order to protect himself. Unable to stop in time, KARR drives off a cliff and seemingly explodes in the ocean.

KARR was only believed to have been destroyed, but in the episode "K.I.T.T. vs. K.A.R.R.", it is revealed he was only damaged and ended up buried in the sand on the beach below the cliffs. When the tide goes out, a young couple stumbles upon the partially buried KARR, digs it out and reactivates it. This time, KARR is furious and had only one clear motive: revenge against Michael Knight and KITT. KARR forces the young couple to disguise him and then drive him around to carry out his plans. In a ravine, KARR challenges Michael and KITT to a final showdown. After releasing the young couple, KARR fires a stolen laser and damages KITT. However, Michael and KITT destroy KARR's laser by reflecting the beam back to the emitter. Damaged, KARR prepares for another attack. KITT and KARR both turbo boost and collide in mid-air. KARR is blown to pieces. Michael and KITT survive the impact; however, at the end of the episode, amongst the wreckage, KARR's CPU module is lying undamaged on the ground, with its LED still flickering. This implies that KARR may still be "alive". Despite this, he doesn't return in later episodes.

A different version of KARR appears in 2008 Knight Rider series. It is revealed that KARR was put to development by Charles Graiman in the past. KITT searched for files pertaining KARR and mentions that KARR had the ability to evolve its own programming and alter its own form. KARR is shown in the form of a Transformer-like robot with far more destructive capabilities than KITT. KARR's development led to the deaths of 7 men and eventually the development was shut down and put away for storage. Charles dreads that someone may have reactivated KARR for his destructive power, and also developed an auto-destruct "backdoor" program into KITT as a final option should KITT have shown destructive tendencies. A pre-recorded message from Dr. Graiman reveals that Mike was KARR's driver and his memories were erased after KARR became uncontrollable.

In the episode "Knight to King's Pawn", the NSA has decided to dismantle the S.S.C. after Dr. Graiman has died so they can then move forward with KARR. With Alex' permission, they remove the chip that contains KITT's personality and memories and place it in KARR, as they wrongfully believed it would overwrite the flaws in KARR's programming. Upset by what has happened, Mike vows to end this once and for all, and infiltrates Area 51 to rescue KITT, using another chip built by Billy to revive KITT. KARR activates himself, viewing the re-activated KITT as a threat that must be terminated as he would allow the possibility of being shut down again. Alex states that he is now in charge and KARR must take his orders; KARR agrees, but then merges Alex with him as a driver to seek out Mike. KARR seems to believe that it is his destiny to merge with Mike as before, and comes after KITT to destroy him and get Mike back. Despite KITT lacking his transformation protocols and weapons, Mike takes him into battle anyway. Using a grappling hook, Mike and KITT pull out KARR's chest plate, freeing Alex but also killing him, and Turbo Boost through his body, destroying him. Mike is later told that the KARR project has been permanently abandoned.

F.L.A.G. Mobile Command Center 

KITT has access to a mobile "garage" called the F.L.A.G. Mobile Command Center, which was a semi-trailer truck owned by the Foundation. In most episodes, it is a GMC General. The trailer has an extendable ramp that dropped down and allows KITT to drive inside even when the truck is in motion. The trailer was loaded with spare parts and equipment for KITT. It also had a computer lab where technicians Bonnie or April would work and conduct repairs and maintenance while in transit. In "KITTnap", KITT is kidnapped and Michael and RC3 use the tractor (which has been disconnected from the trailer) to go and find him.

Reception and significance
KITT, despite being just an AI without a body and with only a rudimentary personality, has proven to be a popular character. One of the reasons for KITT's attractiveness was in the fact that "domesticated" then-powerful technology (computers), making it "accessible, flexible and portable" in a way that was also "reliable and secure". Nickianne Moody has argued that through KITT, Knight Rider became one of "the first popular texts to visualize and narrativize the potential of [computer] technologies to transform daily life". On the other hand, scholars have also looked at the relationship between KITT and its driver, Knight, in the context of the relationship between "man" and "technology", criticizing it for being a metaphor for "masculinity", and even a "classic example of penis-extension". Nonetheless, Moody argues that the relationship between Knight and KITT was more complex and nuanced than many "buddy-ship" relationships of other "Cold War warriors" in the Hollywood works of its era. KITT has also been discussed in the context of the human-robot (or human-AI) interaction.

KITT has also proven to be influential for the design of real-world computers for vehicles, with a number of studies noting that the science-fiction vision of the 1980s, portrayed in the show, is coming to be realized in the real life as of the early 21st century. Shaked and Winter noted that it was "one of the most appealing multimodal mobile interfaces of the 1980s", although talking to computers in a way similar to humans is still in its early stages of maturing as a technology as of 2019.

Various toy versions of KITT have been released. Among the best-known Knight Rider memorabilia is the remote controlled KITT, the Knight Rider lunch box, and the deluxe version of KITT. The deluxe model of KITT, sold by Kenner Toys and dubbed the "Knight 2000 Voice Car", spoke electronically (actual voice of William Daniels), featured a detailed interior and a Michael Knight action figure. ERTL released die-cast toys of KITT in three different sizes—the common miniature sized model, a 'medium' sized model, and a large sized model. These toys featured red reflective holograms on the nose to represent the scanner. Also in late 2004, 1/18 scale die-cast models of KITT and KARR were produced from ERTL complete with detailed interior and light up moving scanner just like in the series. In September 2006, Hitari, a UK based company that produces remote control toy cars, released the Knight Rider KITT remote control car in 1/15 scale complete with the working red scanner lights, KITT's voice from the TV show and the car's turbine engine sound with the "cylon" scanner sound effect. In December 2012, Diamond Select Toys released a talking electronic 1/15 scale KITT which features a light up dashboard, scanner, foglights and tail lights along with the original voice of KITT, William Daniels, all at a push of a button.

Mattel has released two die-cast metal models of KARR. A 1:18 scale model as part of the Hot Wheels Elite collection and a 1:64 scale model as part of the Hot Wheels Retro Nostalgia Entertainment collection. They both resemble KARR's appearance from KITT vs. KARR with silver paint around the bottom half of the vehicle. The small one however lacks the amber scanner light and instead retains the red scanner from KARR's appearance in Trust Doesn't Rust and there is also a KITT which is completely identical to KARR in its first episode in Trust Doesn't Rust.

KITT and KARR are both in Knight Rider: The Game and its sequel. They also appear in the Knight Rider World in Lego Dimensions.

Featuring the iconic voice of William Daniels, the Knight Rider GPS was a fully working GPS using Mio navigational technology. The GPS featured custom recorded voices so that the unit could "speak to" its owner using their own name if it was one of the ones in the recorded set of names.

References
  Text was copied/adapted from K.I.T.T. (2000) at Knight Rider Wiki, which is released under a Creative Commons Attribution-Share Alike 3.0 (Unported) (CC-BY-SA 3.0) license.

External links

 Bringing KITT Back! as detailed in Project: K.I.T.T.

Fictional cars
Knight Rider characters
Fictional artificial intelligences
Fictional computers
Television characters introduced in 1982
One-off cars
Pontiac
Fictional characters who can move at superhuman speeds

de:Knight Rider#K.I.T.T.